Pitomača is a municipality in Croatia in the Virovitica–Podravina County. It has a population of 10,059 (2011 census), of whom 98.62% are Croats.

History 

Since the end of the Ottoman Empire until 1918, Pitomača (named PITOMACA before 1850) was part of the Austrian monarchy (Kingdom of Croatia-Slavonia after the compromise of 1867), in the Croatian Military Frontier, Warasdin-St. Georgener Regiment  N°VI.

References

Populated places in Virovitica-Podravina County
Municipalities of Croatia